The Guildford Arts Book Prize has been awarded annually for the best first novel by an author living anywhere in the UK, and announced at the Guildford Book Festival. Between 1998 and 2005 it was sponsored by Pendleton May and known as the Pendleton May First Novel Award, in 2006 by Goss & Co., and in 2007 by Jelf Group PLC, which had supported the award since its inception.

The winners have been :

1997 : Jeremy Poolman for Interesting Facts about the State of Arizona
1998 : Steve Lundin for This River Awakens
Pendleton May First Novel Award :
1999 : ?
2000 : ?
2001 : Shamim Sarif for The World Unseen
2002 : Hari Kunzru for The Impressionist
2003 : Babs Horton for A Jarful Of Angels
2004 : Panos Karnezis for The Maze
2005 : Clare Clark for The Great Stink
Goss First Novel Award :
2006 : Mike Stocks for White Man Falling
Jelf Group First Novel Award :
Catherine O'Flynn for What Was Lost
First Novel Award
2008 Ross Raisin for God's Own Country
2009 award in abeyance

References

External links
Guildford Book Festival
Pendleton May / Guildford Arts Book Prize

British fiction awards
First book awards
Awards established in 1997
1997 establishments in the United Kingdom
Guildford